The 1979 All-SEC football team consists of American football players selected to the All-Southeastern Conference (SEC) chosen by various selectors for the 1979 NCAA Division I-A football season.

Offensive selections

Receivers 
Preston Brown, Vanderbilt (AP)
Cris Collinsworth, Florida (AP)

Tight ends

Reggie Harper, Tennessee (AP)

Tackles 
Jim Bunch, Alabama (AP)
Matt Braswell, Georgia (AP)

Guards
Mike Brock, Alabama (AP)

Centers 
Dwight Stephenson, Alabama (AP)
Ray Donaldson, Georgia (AP [as G])

Quarterbacks 

 Steadman Shealy, Alabama (AP)

Running backs 

 Joe Cribbs, Auburn (AP)
James Brooks, Auburn (AP)

Defensive selections

Ends 
E. J. Junior, Alabama (AP)
Lyman White, LSU (AP)

Tackles 
David Hannah, Alabama (AP)
Frank Warren, Auburn (AP)

Middle guards
Richard Jaffe, Kentucky (AP)

Linebackers 
 Tom Boyd, Alabama (AP)
Freddie Smith, Auburn (AP)

Backs 
Scott Woerner, Georgia (AP)
Don McNeal, Alabama (AP)
Roland James, Tennessee (AP)
Willie Teal, LSU (AP)

Special teams

Kicker 
Rex Robinson, Georgia (AP)

Punter 

 Jim Miller, Ole Miss (AP)

Key
AP = Associated Press

UPI = United Press International

Bold = Consensus first-team selection by both AP and UPI

See also
1979 College Football All-America Team

References

All-SEC
All-SEC football teams